Sir Christian John Storey Bonington, CVO, CBE, DL (born 6 August 1934) is a British mountaineer.

His career has included nineteen expeditions to the Himalayas, including four to Mount Everest.

Early life and expeditions
Bonington's father, who left the family when Christian was nine months old, was a founding member of L Detachment, Special Air Service.  Bonington first began climbing in 1951 at age 16. Educated at University College School in Hampstead, Bonington joined the Royal Fusiliers before attending Royal Military Academy Sandhurst, and on graduation was commissioned in the Royal Tank Regiment in 1956. After serving three years in North Germany, he spent two years at the Army Outward Bound School as a mountaineering instructor.

Bonington was part of the party that made the first British ascent of the South West Pillar (aka Bonatti Pillar) of the Aiguille du Dru in 1958, and the first ascent of the Central Pillar of Freney on the south side of Mont Blanc in 1961 with Don Whillans, Ian Clough and Jan Dlugosz (Poland). In 1960 he was part of the successful joint British-Indian-Nepalese forces expedition to Annapurna II.

On leaving the British Army in 1961, he joined Van den Berghs, a division of Unilever, but he left after nine months, and became a professional mountaineer and explorer. In 1966 he was given his first assignment by The Daily Telegraph Magazine to cover other expeditions, including climbing Sangay in Ecuador and hunting caribou with Inuit on Baffin Island. In 1968 he accompanied Captain John Blashford-Snell and his British Army team in the attempt to make the first-ever descent of the Blue Nile.

In 1972 he was unsuccessful on the south-west face of Mount Everest, but reached 27,300 feet. He had another shot at that route in 1975, and the 1975 British Mount Everest Southwest Face expedition that he led was successful--it put four climbers on the summit, but Mick Burke died during his summit attempt.

Writing
Bonington has written or edited numerous books, made many television appearances, and received many honours, including the chancellorship of Lancaster University from 2005 to 2014. He is honorary president of the Hiking Club and Lancaster University Mountaineering Club and has a boat named after him among Lancaster University Boat Club's fleet. Furthermore, he is the Honorary President of the British Orienteering Federation. He has lived in Cumbria since 1974. He is a patron, and former president (1988–91), of the British Mountaineering Council (BMC). He succeeded Edmund Hillary as the Honorary President of Mountain Wilderness, an international NGO dedicated to the preservation of mountain areas, in their natural and cultural aspects.

Personal life
Bonington's first wife, Wendy, a freelance illustrator of children's books, died on 24 July 2014 from motor neuron disease (MND), inspiring Bonington to support MND charities. The couple had three children: Conrad (died 1966), Daniel, and Rupert. The family lived at Caldbeck, Cumbria.

Bonington married Loreto McNaught-Davis on Saturday 23 April 2016. McNaught-Davis is the widow of mountaineer and television presenter Ian McNaught-Davis who died in February 2014. The ceremony took place in London in the presence of about 60 friends and family members, including Bonington's son, Rupert.

Tributes
In 1974 Bonington received the Founder's Medal of the Royal Geographical Society. In 1985 he received the Lawrence of Arabia Memorial Medal of the Royal Society for Asian Affairs.  St. Helen's School, Northwood, England has named one of its four houses after him. Bonington was presented with the Golden Eagle Award for services to the outdoors in 2008 by the Outdoor Writers and Photographers Guild.

He was the subject of This Is Your Life in 2003 when he was surprised by Michael Aspel at a hotel in Heathrow.

Honours
Bonington was appointed Commander of the Order of the British Empire (CBE) in 1976 in recognition of the previous year's successful ascent of Everest and was knighted in 1996 for his services to the sport. He was appointed Commander of the Royal Victorian Order (CVO) in the 2010 Birthday Honours for his services to the Outward Bound Trust. He was appointed as a Deputy Lieutenant of Cumbria in 2004. In 2015, Bonnington was awarded the 7th Piolet d'Or Lifetime Achievement Award.

Notable climbs
 1960 Annapurna II (First ascent) with Richard Grant and Sherpa Ang Nyima
 1961 Central Pillar of Freney, Mont Blanc (First ascent) with Ian Clough, Don Whillans and Jan Długosz
 1962 North Wall of the Eiger (First British ascent) with Ian Clough
 1963 Central Tower of Paine, Patagonia (First ascent) with Don Whillans
 1964 Cime de l'Est NE Ridge, Dents du Midi, (First ascent) with John Harlin and Rusty Baillie
 1965 Coronation Street, Cheddar Gorge (First ascent)
 1966 Old Man of Hoy (First ascent) with Tom Patey
 1973 Brammah (6411 metres; 21,033') (First ascent) with Nick Estcourt
 1974 Changabang, Garhwal Himalaya (6864 metres; 22,520') (First ascent) with Don Whillans, Doug Scott and Dougal Haston
 1975 Southwest face of Mount Everest (8848 metres; 29,029') 
 1977 Baintha Brakk (7285 metres; 23,900') (First ascent) with Doug Scott
 1981 Kongur Tagh (7719 metres; 25,325') (First ascent) with Joe Tasker, Al Rouse and Pete Boardman
 1983 West Summit of Shivling, Gangotri (6501 metres; 21,329') (First Ascent)
 1983 Vinson Massif (4897 metres; 16,066') (First British ascent – solo)
 1985 Mount Everest as member of Norwegian Everest Expedition
 1987 Menlungtse (7181 metres; 23,560') attempted FA of main peak via South Buttress, to 6100 metres; 20,013'; w/ Odd Eliason, Bjorn Myrer-Lund, Torgeir Fosse, Helge Ringdal (all Norwegian) and Jim Fotheringham (UK).
 1988 Menlungtse West (7023 metres; 23,041') FA via West Ridge, (expedition leader). Summit attained by Andy Fanshawe and Alan Hinkes (both UK), with David Breashears and Steve Shea (both USA) in support.
 2014 The Old Man of Hoy (137 metres; 450') to mark his 80th birthday and to raise funds for motor neuron disease charities

Expedition leader
 1970 British Annapurna South Face expedition, successful, summit reached by Dougal Haston and Don Whillans; death of Ian Clough
 1972 Mount Everest, (south-west face), unsuccessful
 1975 British Mount Everest Southwest Face expedition, successful, summit reached by Doug Scott, Dougal Haston, Peter Boardman, Pertemba Sherpa and Mick Burke; death of Burke
 1978 K2 (west face), unsuccessful; death of Nick Estcourt
 1982 Mount Everest (north-east ridge), unsuccessful; death of Peter Boardman and Joe Tasker
Although expedition leader, Bonington did not reach the summit of these peaks on these expeditions

Mount Everest record
Chris Bonington briefly became the oldest known person to summit Mount Everest in April 1985, at the age of 50. He was surpassed by Richard Bass (of Seven Summits fame), who summited later that same season at 55 years old, five years older than Bonington. The record has been surpassed multiple times since.

Bibliography
 I Chose to Climb (Gollancz) 1966
 Annapurna South Face (Cassell) 1971
 The Next Horizon (Gollancz) 1973
 Everest South West Face (Hodder and Stoughton) 1973
 Changabang (Heinemann) 1975
 Everest the Hard Way (Hodder and Stoughton) 1976
 Quest for Adventure (Hodder and Stoughton) 1981
 Kongur: China's Elusive Summit (Hodder and Stoughton) 1982
 Everest: The Unclimbed Ridge (with Dr Charles Clarke) (Hodder and Stoughton) 1983
 The Everest Years (Hodder and Stoughton) 1986
 Mountaineer: Thirty Years of Climbing on the World's Great Peaks (Diadem) 1989
 The Climbers (BBC Books and Hodder and Stoughton) 1992
 Sea, Ice and Rock (with Robin Knox-Johnston) (Hodder and Stoughton) 1992
 Great Climbs (Ed with Audrey Salkeld) (Reed Illustrated Books) 1994
 Tibet's Secret Mountain, the Triumph of Sepu Kangri (with Dr Charles Clarke) (Weidenfeld & Nicolson) 1999
 Boundless Horizons (Weidenfeld & Nicolson) 2000
 Chris Bonington's Everest (Weidenfeld & Nicolson) 2002
 Chris Bonington's Lakeland Heritage (with Roly Smith) (Halsgrove) 2004
 Chris Bonington Mountaineer (Vertebrate Publishing) 2016
 Ascent (Simon & Schuster UK) 2017

See also
 Rock climbing
 Ice climbing
 List of Mount Everest records
 List of Mount Everest summiters by number of times to the summit

References

External links
 
 Chris Bonington Home Page
 Interview with WideWorld magazine
 The Everest Years: Reflections of a mountaineer while climbing in the Lake District. BBC Radio 4 documentary first broadcast in 1988. Accessed 26 November 2012.
 Mount Everest Interview with Chris Bonington
 

1934 births
Living people
Royal Tank Regiment officers
English mountain climbers
Commanders of the Order of the British Empire
Commanders of the Royal Victorian Order
Knights Bachelor
People in sports awarded knighthoods
People educated at University College School
People from Hampstead
Presidents of the Alpine Club (UK)
British summiters of Mount Everest
People associated with Lancaster University
Deputy Lieutenants of Cumbria
People from Caldbeck
Piolet d'Or winners